Lester John Biederman  (June 7, 1907 – November 30, 1981) was an American sports writer and columnist, writing exclusively for The Pittsburgh Press, from 1930 until his retirement in 1969. He was known for, among other things, his highly racist descriptions and portrayals of athletes such as Roberto Clemente.

Career 
From 1938, Biederman covered the Pittsburgh Pirates, becoming the Press' sports editor in 1966; excluding his military service in World War II, he served in both capacities until his retirement in 1969. For the final 20 of those years, Biederman was also a correspondent for The Sporting News.

In 1953, he was elected to the Board of Directors of the Baseball Writers' Association of America; in 1959, he served as its president. That same year, Biederman was named Pennsylvania Sportswriter of the Year by the National Sportscasters and Sportswriters Association. In 1956, he initiated the Scoreboard Fund, under the umbrella of the Press Old Newsboys; over the next 14 years, under Biederman's direction, the fund raised approximately half a million dollars for the Children's Hospital of Pittsburgh.

References

Further reading 
 Biederman, Les. "The Scoreboard: 30-Year Span With Pirates Revives Thrills". The Pittsburgh Press. February 19, 1967

External links

1907 births
1981 deaths
Baseball writers
Sportspeople from Pittsburgh
Sportswriters from Pennsylvania
Writers from Pittsburgh
20th-century American non-fiction writers